Callistocypraea is a genus of sea snails, marine gastropod mollusks in the family Cypraeidae, the cowries.

Species
 Callistocypraea aurantium (Gmelin, 1791)
 Callistocypraea broderipii (J. E. Gray in G. B. Sowerby I, 1832)
 Callistocypraea leucodon (Broderip, 1828)
 Callistocypraea nivosa (Broderip, 1827)
Species brought into synonymy
 Callistocypraea peyroti Schilder, 1932: synonym of  Lyncina peyroti (Schilder, 1932) (original combination)
 Callistocypraea testudinaria (Linnaeus): synonym of Chelycypraea testudinaria (Linnaeus, 1758)

References

 Schilder F. A. (1927). Revision der Cypreacea (Moll. Gastr.). Archiv für Naturgeschichte, Berlin A91 (10): 1-171

External links
 

Cypraeidae